Chandra Shekhar Mehta (20 June 1945 – 12 April 2006) was a Uganda-born Kenyan rally driver. He won the Safari Rally a record five times (1973, 1979–82), including four consecutively, and in 1981 finished fifth in the World Rally Championship.

Biography
A Kenyan of Indian descent, he was born in 1945 to a family of plantation owners in Uganda, and began rallying behind the wheel of a BMW aged 21. In 1972, he and his family fled Idi Amin's regime to Kenya, the year before he clinched his first Safari Rally title.

He was born into a wealthy business family, the son of Khimji Mehta and the grandson of Nanji Kalidas Mehta, founder of the Mehta Group. He was the cousin of Indian businessman, Jay Mehta who is the head of the Mehta Group. He married his sometime co-driver Yvonne Pratt in 1978 after a ten-year courtship, and they had one son, Vijay, in 1980.

Through the most successful period of his career he drove Datsun cars. He won the inaugural African Rally Championship in 1981, and the Cyprus Rally in 1976. He was on the podium at the 1981 Rally Codasur, twice at the Acropolis Rally and three times at the Rallye Côte d'Ivoire. His career came to an end in 1986 after a nearly fatal crash at Rallye des Pharaons, Egypt while driving for Peugeot.

After his driving days were over he held various administrative positions at the FIA. He became president of the FIA Rally commission in 1997, and was re-appointed as interim President of the World Rally Championship commission shortly before his death. He died in London on 12 April 2006 from liver problems, hepatitis, and illness relating to complications from an old injury.

References

External links 
 Driver profile, Rallybase.nl
 "Datsun and The East African Safari Rally" , Datsunhistory.com

1945 births
Ugandan people of Indian descent
2006 deaths
Deaths from hepatitis
Kenyan Hindus
World Rally Championship drivers
Ugandan emigrants to Kenya
Kenyan rally drivers
Kenyan people of Indian descent
Arya Samajis
Peugeot Sport drivers
Audi Sport drivers
Nismo drivers